Winscales is a civil parish in the Borough of Allerdale in Cumbria, England.  It contains two listed buildings that are recorded in the National Heritage List for England.  Both the listed buildings are designated at Grade II, the lowest of the three grades, which is applied to "buildings of national importance and special interest".  The parish is mainly rural, and the listed buildings comprise a farmhouse with attached farm buildings, and a milestone.


Buildings

References

Citations

Sources

Lists of listed buildings in Cumbria